The Belaya is a river in the center of the Kola Peninsula in Murmansk Oblast, Russia. It is 24 km in length. The Belaya originates in the Lake Bolshoy Vudyavr and flows into the Lake Imandra.

References

Rivers of Murmansk Oblast